Imre Szabics (born 22 March 1981) is a Hungarian football manager and former professional footballer.

Szabics was born in Szeged where he played as a youngster. He was spotted by Ferencváros and signed for them in 1990, making his professional debut in 1998. He spent only one season at the club before moving to Austrian club Sturm Graz. Good form led to an international call-up in 2003, after which he signed for German side VfB Stuttgart. He had a disappointing season in 2004–05 in which he was mostly only used as a substitute, before joining 1. FC Köln in 2005.

After initially being a first-team striker, Szabics had little later success at this club and left when his contract expired in 2006. He was signed by Mainz 05, but was once again unsuccessful. In the summer of 2007, Szabics joined newly promoted 2. Bundesliga side FC Augsburg spending three years with the club. In May 2010, Szabics returned to his former club Sturm Graz.

In 2014 Pál Dárdai appointed Szabics as an assistant coach of the Hungary national football team. Dárdai's successor, Bernd Storck, replaced him with Andreas Möller.

Club career

Ferencváros
Imre Szabics was born in Szeged and started to play football at local club Szeged LC in 1990. He spent five years with the club before leaving it for Ferencvárosi TC in 1995. Szabics immediately became the favourite player of the fans of the club since he scored 12 goals in 24 matches.

Sturm Graz
In 1999 Szabics was signed by the Austrian SK Sturm Graz. He played for the Austrian club from 1999 to 2003. During this time, he played in the UEFA Champions League 1999–00 season where Sturm qualified for the second group stages. His last season at Sturm was especially successful, as he became the club's top goalscorer by scoring 11 goals in 27 Bundesliga appearances that season. In May 2003 Szabics was sacked from Sturm because of his "non-compliance with work regulations".

VfB Stuttgart
Szabics subsequently moved to Germany signing with Bundesliga side VfB Stuttgart in the summer of 2003. He spent two seasons with the club, appearing in a total of 49 Bundesliga matches and scoring 14 goals for VfB Stuttgart in the league. He also played in seven matches in the Champions League season of 2003–04, scoring twice against Manchester United. After a less successful season 2004–05, in which he was mostly only used as a substitute, the striker moved to another Bundesliga side, 1. FC Köln, in the summer of 2005.

1. FC Köln
In June 2005 Szabics was signed by the German 1. FC Köln. Szabics had little success at this club, collecting only 11 Bundesliga appearances and scoring one goal in the league before they were relegated to the 2. Bundesliga with a 17th-place finish. He went on to sign a two-year contract with Bundesliga side 1. FSV Mainz 05 in early August 2006. After initially being a first-team striker, he got unlucky again later on, being relegated to the bench in the second half of the season.

FC Augsburg
After having played in 20 games for Mainz, scoring twice, Imre was transferred to 2. Bundesliga newcomers FC Augsburg in the summer of 2007. There, he played in eight games at the start of the season, scoring twice before he was sidelined by an injury at the end of September.

Sturm Graz
On 1 May 2010, it was announced that Szabics would return to SK Sturm Graz for the 2010–11 season. Szabics won the Austrian Football Bundesliga in 2011. Szabics's team faced the Hungarian League winner Videoton in the qualifiers of the 2010–11 UEFA Champions League season. It was a special tie for Szabics because he had not played against a Hungarian club since he left his home country. He scored the first goal for his team, which beat Videoton by 2–0 at home. In the away match, Sturm lost to 3–2 but qualified for the next round. In September 2013 Szabics announced his retirement from football.

International career
Szabics made his debut for the Hungary national team in their friendly match against Luxembourg on 30 April 2003 and went on to score two goals in a 5–1 victory for the Hungarians. He subsequently made four appearances and scored four goals for Hungary in the Euro 2004 qualifying, including a brace in his competitive debut and the team's 3–1 home victory over Latvia on 7 June 2003. He also played for Hungary in five matches of the 2006 World Cup qualifying and scored one goal, the 3–2 winner against Iceland at home in the team's second match of the qualifying. Hungary failed to qualify for any of the two tournaments by finishing fourth in their groups in both of the two qualifying campaigns.

After the injuries of Rudolf, Priskin, and Szalai, Szabics was called up for Hungary again after four years on 3 June 2011. Going in as a substitute for the second half, Szabics scored the only goal of the game in the 53rd minute. On 2 September 2011, Szabics scored against Sweden at the Puskás Ferenc Stadium in the last minutes of the first half; however, Sweden equalized in the second half. A late goal by Szabics's fellow striker Gergely Rudolf resulted the celebration of 25,000 spectators after the team beat Sweden in the Euro 2012 qualifying by 2–1.

Managerial career
On 18 September 2014, Pál Dárdai was appointed as interim manager of the Hungarian national football team, and he appointed Szabics as an assistant coach. In an interview with the ORF, Szabics stated that it was a big honour to be the assistant coach of the Hungarian national team. In an interview with Nemzeti Sport, he said that he was not important in this story, but the national team was. He was replaced by Andreas Möller in October 2015. Assistant manager in Austrian national team.

Career statistics

Scores and results list Hungary's goal tally first, score column indicates score after each Szabics goal.

Managerial statistics 
As of 15 July 2021

Honours
Sturm Graz
 Austrian Bundesliga: 2010–11, Runner-up 2000
 Austrian Cup: Runner-up 2002
 Austrian Supercup: Runner-up 2002

VfB Stuttgart
League Cup: Runner-up 2005

FC Augsburg
 2. Bundesliga: Third place 2009–10

Individual
 Hungarian Footballer of the Year: 2003

References

External links

  

1981 births
Living people
Association football forwards
Hungarian footballers
Hungary international footballers
Hungarian football managers
Ferencvárosi TC footballers
SK Sturm Graz players
VfB Stuttgart players
1. FSV Mainz 05 players
1. FC Köln players
FC Augsburg players
Bundesliga players
2. Bundesliga players
Austrian Football Bundesliga players
Nemzeti Bajnokság I players
Fehérvár FC managers
Nemzeti Bajnokság I managers
Hungarian expatriate footballers
Hungarian expatriate sportspeople in Germany
Expatriate footballers in Germany
Hungarian expatriate sportspeople in Austria
Expatriate footballers in Austria
Hungary youth international footballers
Hungary under-21 international footballers
Sportspeople from Szeged